Spas Penev (born 10 June 1933) is a Bulgarian wrestler. He competed in the men's Greco-Roman featherweight at the 1960 Summer Olympics.

References

External links
 

1933 births
Living people
Bulgarian male sport wrestlers
Olympic wrestlers of Bulgaria
Wrestlers at the 1960 Summer Olympics
Sportspeople from Pernik
20th-century Bulgarian people